No. 644 Squadron RAF was a unit in 38 Group of the Royal Air Force during World War II which undertook glider-towing and supply dropping missions as well being employed in the paratroop role.

History

Formation and World War II

When the buildup for Operation Overlord got under way, an increasing need for transport and airborne assault squadrons became apparent. Therefore, personnel and aircraft from No. 298 Squadron RAF at RAF Tarrant Rushton were formed into No. 644 Squadron on 23 February 1944 as part of No. 38 Group RAF. Operations also included supply dropping to SOE forces and glider towing during the operations Overlord, Market Garden and Varsity. They also carried out supply drops over Norway and even some tactical night-bombing missions towards the end of the war.

Post war
Following the end of hostilities in Europe, 644 Squadron helped to transport the 1st Parachute Brigade to Copenhagen on 8 May, where they were to oversee the surrender and disarmament of the German forces in Denmark. On the following day they carried the remainder of the 1st Airborne Division to Norway for similar duties. Ever since the Normandy invasion, No. 46 Group RAF had been involved in a "shuttle service" of ferrying freight to the front line and removing either wounded or freed prisoners of war to Britain. Although most of the armies were more or less static now that the War was over, RAF Transport Command's responsibilities increased, and so No. 38 Group RAF received orders to assist in this capacity. In addition to the transport of freight and prisoners of war, No. 644 Squadron also flew service personnel to Greece, North Africa and Italy. In July, the Squadron lost a Halifax over the Pyrenees. 
In November 1945, the 6th Airborne Division was despatched to Palestine as a quick reaction peace keeping force for the British Empire, and 644 Squadron were ordered to lend them their support and so accompanied them to RAF Qastina in Palestine (now Hatzor Airbase). On 1 September 1946 No. 644 squadron disbanded by being re-numbered to No. 47 Squadron RAF.

Present
The squadron today is represented by No. 644 Volunteer Gliding Squadron, which has the same squadron badge though with a different motto.

Aircraft operated

Squadron bases

Commanding officers

In popular culture
In the Dreamworks animated movie Chicken Run, Fowler reveals that he was a mascot for the 644 Squadron.

References

Notes

Bibliography

External links
 
 No. 644 Squadron history on RAF WWII 38 Group Squadrons Reunited
 RAF website
 644 Squadron website
 No. 644 Volunteer Gliding Squadron

644
Aircraft squadrons of the Royal Air Force in World War II
Transport units and formations of the Royal Air Force
Military units and formations established in 1944
Military units and formations disestablished in 1946
Military units and formations in Mandatory Palestine in World War II